Anton Army Airfield is a former United States Army Air Forces World War II airfield in Panama used as an auxiliary of Howard Field as part of the defense of the Panama Canal.

Wartime units assigned to the station were:
 30th Fighter Squadron (XXVI Fighter Command), 3 January-10 February 1943 (P-40 Warhawk)
 29th Bombardment Squadron (6th Bombardment Group), 29 March-13 May 1943 (Northrup A-17 Nomad)

Today there is little or no trace of the airfield.

References

 Maurer, Maurer (1983). Air Force Combat Units Of World War II. Maxwell AFB, Alabama: Office of Air Force History. .

External links

Airfields of the United States Army Air Forces in Panama
Airports established in 1943